Čachtice Castle is a castle ruin in Slovakia next to the village of Čachtice. It stands on a hill featuring rare plants, and has been declared a national nature reserve for this reason. The castle was a residence and later the prison of the Countess and alleged serial killer Elizabeth Báthory.

Čachtice was built in the mid-13th century by Kazimir from the Hont-Pázmány gens as a sentry on the road to Moravia. Later, it belonged to Matthew Csák, the Stibor family, and then to Elizabeth Báthory. Čachtice, its surrounding lands and villages, was a wedding gift from the Nádasdy family upon Elizabeth's marriage to Ferenc Nádasdy in 1575.

Originally, Čachtice was a Romanesque castle with an interesting horseshoe-shaped residence tower. It was turned into a Gothic castle later and its size was increased in the 15th and 16th centuries. A Renaissance renovation followed in the 17th century. In 1708 the castle was captured by the rebels of Francis II Rákóczi. It was neglected and burned down in 1799. It was left to decay until it was turned into a tourist attraction in 2014.

In popular culture

 Along with the Orava Castle, the Čachtice Castle was used as the location for Count Orlok's castle in Nosferatu.
 A slightly dressed up version of Čachtice is used for the exterior shots of Baron Gorc's castle in the 1981 Czechoslovakian comedy The Mysterious Castle in the Carpathians.
 Čachtice was used as the castle ruins set featured in the opening sequence of the 1996 fantasy movie Dragonheart by Universal Pictures starring Dennis Quaid.
 Čachtice Castle was featured in the "Castle of the Blood Countess" episode of the ABC Family show The Scariest Places on Earth, as well as the August 2008 episode "Tortured Souls" on the SyFy channels series Ghost Hunters International.
 Juraj Jakubisko's 2008 film Bathory is set in Čachtice Castle, where some scenes were filmed.

Gallery

References

Further reading

In English:

In French:

In German:

In Hungarian:

In Slovak:

External links

The Bloody Countess? - Translation of Dr. Szádeczky-Kardoss Irma's job
The Lies about Elizabeth Bathory - Inquest of National Geographic Channel
Čachtice castle and the blood countess Alžbeta Báthory
Slovakia Cachtice (Bathory) Castle (video)

13th-century fortifications
Buildings and structures demolished in 1799
Romanesque architecture in Slovakia
Castles in Slovakia
Ruined castles in Slovakia
Nádasdy family
Buildings and structures in Trenčín Region
Elizabeth Báthory
Burned buildings and structures